Vladislav Virić (Serbian Cyrillic: Владислав Вирић, born 11 April 1979) is a Serbian professional football manager and former player who lasted coached Ghana Premier League club Dreams FC.

Coaching career

Dreams FC 
In January 2021, Ghanaian club Dreams FC announced the appointment of Virić as their new head coach. As of his appointment the club were trailing in the 16th position with a poor record of one win, three draws, and three defeats whilst in the relegation zone of the Ghana Premier League standings with just six points.

In the month of February he led the club to 3 wins, 1 draw and a lose, leading them to a top four position at the end of the month. He was nominated for the Ghana Premier League coach of the month for February based on that performance. He later beat off competition from Medeama SC coach's Samuel Boadu, who had also led his team to the same feat in February and Berekum Chelsea’s Abu Abdul-Hanan to win the award. At the end of the season, he led the club to a 7th place finish. On 8 February 2022, he mutually parted ways with Dreams, with one match to end the first round of the 2021–22 Ghana Premier League season.

Honours 
 Ghana Premier League coach of the month: February 2020

References

External links 
 
 
 
 

Living people
1979 births
Dreams F.C. (Ghana) managers
Serbian football managers
Ghana Premier League managers
Expatriate football managers in Ghana
Serbian expatriate sportspeople in Ghana
Oulun Palloseura players
FK Mash'al Mubarek players
FK Sloboda Užice players
Serbian footballers
Serbian expatriate footballers
Expatriate footballers in Finland
Expatriate footballers in Uzbekistan